Aleksandre Roland Rekhviashvili (born 6 August 1974) is a Georgian football official and a former midfielder. He works as a sporting director of Dinamo Tbilisi. 

He played on the national team and has been capped 21 times since his debut in 1999.

His club career started in Dinamo Tbilisi in 1991. In 1997, he went to Latvian champion team Skonto FC, where he gradually became one of the best defensive midfielders in the Latvian league, being voted the best league player at the end of 2000/01. In 2003, he was bought by Russian team Torpedo-Metallurg, but after one season he returned to Latvia and FK Ventspils.

External links
 GeorgianSoccer.com
 
 

1974 births
Living people
Footballers from Georgia (country)
Georgia (country) international footballers
FC Moscow players
Russian Premier League players
Expatriate footballers from Georgia (country)
Expatriate footballers in Russia
Expatriate footballers in Latvia
Skonto FC players
FC Dinamo Tbilisi players
Ukrainian Premier League players
Expatriate footballers in Azerbaijan
Expatriate footballers in Ukraine
Expatriate sportspeople from Georgia (country) in Ukraine
Association football midfielders
Expatriate sportspeople from Georgia (country) in Azerbaijan